Charles Henry Hunter (September 19, 1817 – June 3, 1870), was a Pennsylvania militia officer and physician from Berks County, Pennsylvania, who served in the American Civil War.

Early life 
Charles Hunter was born on September 19, 1817, in Rockland, Berks County, Pennsylvania, the sixth child of Jacob VanReed Hunter and Sarah Fisher. He had eight siblings, five older and three younger. Hunter attended college and graduated from Princeton University in 1837 and from the University of Pennsylvania Medical School in 1841. Hunter followed the practice of a physician, but was also interested in military affairs, and he enlisted as a private into the Washington Grays (Philadelphia), a Philadelphia, Pennsylvania Militia regiment, and was later promoted captain. In 1856, he was commissioned a brigadier general in the Pennsylvania Militia and given the command of the 1st Brigade, 5th Division, Pennsylvania Volunteers. In 1860, Hunter married Emilie Elizabeth Nicholson.

American Civil War 
When the American Civil War began in 1861, Hunter sided with the Union. On September 12, 1861, he became the Captain of Company E, 11th Pennsylvania Volunteer Militia Infantry Regiment, before the regiment mustered out in late September 1862. On July 6, 1863, Hunter was mustered in as the colonel of the 42nd Pennsylvania Volunteer Militia Infantry, an emergency regiment formed to fight Confederate General Robert E. Lee's invasion into Pennsylvania that became known as the Gettysburg Campaign. Hunter and the 42nd Pennsylvania Militia mustered out on August 12, 1863, without seeing any action. In 1864, he became a Surgeon in the Volunteer Aid Corps under the Major Joseph Smith.

Later life 
Charles Hunter and Emilie Elizabeth Nicholson had six sons, Charles H. Hunter (born 1860), Jacob Van Reed Hunter (born 1862), James Nicholson Hunter (born 1865), Henry M. Hunter (born 1867), and Edward Clymer Hunter (born 1869). He died on June 3, 1870, in Reading, Berks County, Pennsylvania.

References 

American militia generals
1817 births
1870 deaths